John Robert Howe (7 October 1915 – 5 April 1987) was a professional footballer who gained three caps for England in the late 1940s. He was a part of the Derby County side that won the 1946 FA Cup Final.

Playing career

Jack Howe was seen as one of the best two footed full-backs in Britain for his era. Standing six foot tall, Howe could kick a ball equally hard and accurately with either foot. 

Howe started his playing career with his hometown club, Hartlepool, in 1934. He played 16 times in his first season with the club. Howe transferred to Derby County in 1936.

Howe made his debut as Derby were finishing eight points behind champions Sunderland and was a regular until the Second World War when he joined the Queen's Own Cameron Highlanders and guested for Hearts, Falkirk, Aberdeen, and St Mirren. He played for the Scottish League against the British Army and, after service in India, he was demobbed in time to earn an FA Cup winner's medal playing centre-half in the semi-final replay and left back at Wembley. 

Howe never shirked a tackle, was totally dominant and took over the captaincy when Raich Carter went to Hull in 1948. Howe, among Derby's greatest defenders, was one of the first professional sportsmen to wear contact lenses. He was over 40 before he ended his career with Kings Lynn.

International career
Howe made his England debut in 1948 in a 4-0 win against Italy. He went on to make two more appearances for his country.

Personal life
He was married to Eileen Howe and they had two children, Patricia and John. They had four grandchildren Susie, Rob, Steven and Leesa. 
His grandson, Steve Fletcher also played professionally and is the record appearance holder with AFC Bournemouth.

References

1915 births
1987 deaths
Footballers from Hartlepool
English footballers
England international footballers
English Football League players
Association football defenders
Hartlepool United F.C. players
Derby County F.C. players
Huddersfield Town A.F.C. players
King's Lynn F.C. managers
English football managers
FA Cup Final players